George Alan Brodrick, 5th Viscount Midleton (10 June 1806 – 1 November 1848) was a British nobleman.

The son of George Brodrick, 4th Viscount Midleton and Maria Benyon, he succeeded to the peerage in 1836. He was educated at Eton College. He married Ellen Griffiths in 1833.

He engaged the leading English architect, Decimus Burton, to make improvements in the streetscape of Cobh, Co. Cork.

His death was attributed to intentional charcoal inhalation.

References

1806 births
1848 deaths
People educated at Eton College
Alumni of St John's College, Cambridge
Viscounts in the Peerage of Ireland